Vavta Vas (in older sources also Valta vas) is a village on the right bank of the Krka River in the Municipality of Straža in southeastern Slovenia. The area is part of the historical region of Lower Carniola. The municipality is now included in the Southeast Slovenia Statistical Region. The Dular Mill in the village is represented on the municipal coat of arms.

Name
Vavta Vas was attested in written sources in 1436 as Walpottendorff (and as Waltendorf in 1449 and Waltensdorf in 1465). The medieval names indicate that the Slovene name is derived from *Valpťa vas, literally 'reeve's village', from the Slovene common noun valpot 'chief steward at a manor' (borrowed from Old High German waltboto 'ruler's deputy'). Compare also Vavpča vas.

Church
The local parish church is dedicated to Saint James and belongs to the Roman Catholic Diocese of Novo Mesto. It was built in the 18th century on the site of a medieval predecessor.

References

External links

Vavta Vas at Geopedia
Parish of Vavta Vas
Vavta Vas Elementary School

Populated places in the Municipality of Straža